Young-tae is a Korean masculine given name.  Its meaning differs based on the hanja used to write each syllable of the name. There are 39 hanja with the reading "young" and 20 hanja with the reading "tae" on the South Korean government's official list of hanja which may be used in given names. 

People with this name include:
Byeon Yeong-tae (1892–1969), South Korean politician, 5th Prime Minister
Li Yongtai (1928–2015), Chinese politician and air force lieutenant general of Korean descent
Young-Tae Chang (born 1968), South Korean chemistry professor
Kim Young-tae (born 1975), South Korean weightlifter, represented South Korea at the 2000 Summer Olympics
Ko Young-tae (born 1976), South Korean businessman and fencer
Boo Young-tae (born 1985), South Korean football forward (K3 League)
Gil Young-tae (born 1991), South Korean football centre-back (K-League Classic)

See also
List of Korean given names

References

Korean masculine given names